Drowning Mona is a 2000 American crime comedy film starring Danny DeVito as Wyatt Rash, a local police chief from Verplanck, New York, who investigates the mysterious death of Mona Dearly (Bette Midler), a spiteful, hard-drinking, loud-mouthed, abusive woman, hated by all who knew her, who drove her son's car off a cliff and drowned in a river. The film received negative reviews from critics.

Plot

Mona Dearly can't unlock her car so, as her keys fit her son's Yugo, she takes that and drives off. On a bend, the brakes fail completely and she drives off a cliff into the Hudson River. Clarence, fishing in the river, sees it happen. Chief Wyatt Rash observes there are no skid marks on the road.

Her long-suffering husband Phil and son Jeph, show no grief when learning of Mona's death, an abusive, belligerent heavy drinker, loved by none. (Jeph is more concerned about his car.)

Ellie Rash (Wyatt's daughter) wants to celebrate as the Dearlys treated Bobby (her fiancé and Jeph's business partner) badly. JB Landscaping is not doing well due to Jeph's laziness and poor behavior.

Phil and Rona, who are having an affair, meet at the Charm Motel. He expresses happiness about Mona's death but denies involvement. Bobby meets Murph, his older brother, who has been helping him financially. Murpf suspects he had a hand in Mona's death.

Wyatt's investigation takes him to Jeph, who claims that Bobby threatened and attacked Mona. Lucinda, the local mechanic specializing in Yugos (driven by everyone in town) informs Wyatt that the car Mona was driving had been tampered with in multiple ways.

Phil tells Wyatt he had been a battered husband, as Mona suspected he was having an affair. He also claims Jeph and Mona had had an argument on the evening before the accident. Bobby tells Wyatt he hated Mona and that they had had an argument over Jeph's pay. She would not let him dissolve the partnership unless Bobby bought them out. Phil and Jeph leave Mona's wake very early.

Meanwhile, Wyatt breaks into the Dearlys', finding that Mona's and Jeph's car keys had been switched. Phil expresses his gratitude to Bobby for killing Mona. Bobby then confesses to Ellie that he rigged Jeph's car, as Jeph was destroying their business. She then announces she is pregnant. Clarence overhears their conversation.

Phil tells Wyatt he spotted Bobby near the Dearly residence on the night before the accident, claiming that he did not say this earlier because Wyatt and Bobby wil soon be family. Jeph, who is also involved with Rona, finds out about Phil's affair with her. Bobby tells Wyatt that Mona threatened him, not the other way around, and that he was in the Hideaway the evening before the accident, which Valerie tells him is not true. Murph later tries to cover Bobby on this. Valerie also gives him a sharp gardening tool with the letters "JB" on it.

Phil is found dead in a pond at the Charm Motel. Murph tells Ellie, who fears that Bobby, who left their house that night, did it. When Rona finds out, she tries to leave town. It turns out Jeph did not help Phil when he fell into the water after he threatened to expose him, Rona, and Bobby.

Police learn that Jeph is threatening suicide because of Rona's leaving. He reveals that a drunken Mona had unrepentantly chopped off his hand when they fought over a bottle of beer. He also states that Phil was not his biological father, adding that, despite all that, he did not kill either of them. Wyatt manages to take the gun away from Jeph.

Wyatt then tells Bobby privately that Clarence confessed to killing Phil, because he could not stand the idea of Bobby going to jail with the baby on the way. Clarence was watching Phil – who had seen Bobby rig the car – tampering with it some more and then switching the keys in the house. Bobby's initial tampering had been superficial and did not contribute to the accident, whereas Phil's did.

Wyatt promises Bobby to keep quiet about Bobby's involvement as long as he takes good care of Ellie and the baby. Finally, Bobby and Ellie get married and Clarence gets taken away.

Cast
Danny DeVito as Chief Wyatt Rash
Bette Midler as Mona Dearly
Neve Campbell as Ellen "Ellie" Rash
Jamie Lee Curtis as Rona Mace
Casey Affleck as Bobby Calzone
William Fichtner as Phil Dearly
Marcus Thomas as Jeph Dearly
Peter Dobson as Lt. Feege Gruber
Kathleen Wilhoite as Lucinda
Mark Pellegrino as Murph Calzone
Tracey Walter as Clarence
Will Ferrell as Cubby, the Funeral Director
Paul Ben-Victor as Deputy Tony Carlucci
Paul Schulze as Deputy Jimmy D.
Melissa McCarthy as Shirley
Brian Doyle-Murray as Tow Truck Driver
Raymond O'Connor as Father Tom
Lisa Rieffel as Valerie Antonelli

Reception
On Rotten Tomatoes, the film has a rating of 29% based on 76 reviews, and an average rating of 4.41/10. The critical consensus reads, "A whodunnit that stacks its list of suspects with wasted character actors, Drowning Mona is a twee farce that will prompt audiences to tune out before the mystery is solved."

Box office

The film opened at #4 at the North American box office making $5.8 million USD in its opening weekend behind My Dog Skip, The Next Best Thing and The Whole Nine Yards. Ultimately, however, the box office gross was an impressive $15.9 million compared with a budget of $6 million.

Awards and nominations

Nominations
ALMA Awards: Outstanding Director of a Feature Film (Nick Gomez)

References

External links

 
 

2000 films
2000 comedy films
2000 black comedy films
2000s English-language films
American black comedy films
American crime comedy films
Films about automobiles
Films directed by Nick Gomez
Films scored by Michael Tavera
2000s American films
Films set in New York (state)